Nigbo is an extinct Plateau language of Nigeria. It was spoken near Agameti on the Fadan Karshi-Wamba road near Sanga LGA, Kaduna State. The language, listed in Blench (2012) and (2019), is not reported in Ethnologue or Glottolog. It is presumably an Alumic language based on its proximity to Akpondu, a language closely related to Alumu and Tesu.

The extinct undocumented languages Akpondu and Babur (Bəbər) were also spoken in nearby villages of Nigbo and Babur, respectively.

References

Languages of Nigeria
Alumic languages
Extinct languages of Africa
Languages extinct in the 21st century